Henri Abadie (born 13 February 1963) is a French former professional racing cyclist. He rode in two editions of the Tour de France, two editions of the Giro d'Italia and one edition of the Vuelta a España.

References

External links
 

1963 births
Living people
French male cyclists
Sportspeople from Tarbes
Cyclists from Occitania (administrative region)